The channel in between Vaavu Atoll and Meemu Atoll from the eastern set of atolls and Ari Atoll and Nilandhe Atoll from the western set of atolls in the Maldives.

References
 Divehiraajjege Jōgrafīge Vanavaru. Muhammadu Ibrahim Lutfee. G.Sōsanī.

Channels of the Maldives
Channels of the Indian Ocean